Elyne Boeykens (born 3 April 1991) is a Belgian tennis player. She has a career-high singles ranking of world No. 297, which she achieved on 1 August 2017. She has won 5 singles and 6 doubles titles on the ITF Circuit. Her highest WTA doubles ranking is No. 222, reached on 19 September 2016.

References

1991 births
Living people
Belgian female tennis players
21st-century Belgian women
Female tennis players playing padel